North Mountain is a 2015 Canadian action thriller film. Written and directed by Bretten Hannam and billed as a "cross between Brokeback Mountain and Rambo", the film stars Justin Rain as Wolf, a young Mi'kmaq hunter who encounters Crane (Glen Gould), a wanted fugitive, in the forest. The two men fall in love and begin a relationship, which is tested when the gangsters looking for Crane arrive.

The film's cast also includes Meredith MacNeill, Gharrett Patrick Paon, Glenn Lefchak, Johnny Terris, Gary Levert, Preston Carmichael, Scott Baker, Daniel Fanaberia, Zach Tovey, Katherine Sorbey and John Allen MacLean.

Shot near Kejimkujik National Park in January 2015, the film premiered on September 23, 2015 at the Atlantic Film Festival. It screened at various LGBT film festivals, including Toronto's Inside Out Film and Video Festival and the Vancouver Queer Film Festival, in 2016, and received a limited commercial run in 2018 at Toronto's Carlton Theatre.

See also
List of lesbian, gay, bisexual or transgender-related films of 2015

References

External links 
 

2015 films
Canadian action thriller films
2015 action thriller films
Canadian LGBT-related films
LGBT-related thriller films
2015 LGBT-related films
First Nations films
LGBT First Nations culture
Films shot in Nova Scotia
2015 directorial debut films
2010s English-language films
2010s Canadian films